Robert Bale, O.Carm., (died 1503), was an English Carmelite friar and scholar.

Biography
Bale was a native of Norfolk, and when very young entered the Carmelite monastery at Norwich. Having a great love of learning, he spent a portion of every year in the Carmelite priories at Oxford or Cambridge. He became prior of the monastery of his order at Burnham Norton. Bale enjoyed a high reputation for learning, and collected a valuable library, which he bequeathed to his priory upon his death on 11 November 1503.

His principal works were: 
 Annales Ordinis Carmelitarum (Bod. Arch. Seld. B. 72). 
 Historia Heliæ Prophetæ
 Officium Simonis Angli (i.e. of St. Simon Stock, the first English Carmelite friar and a major figure in the establishment of the Carmelite Order).

References

Attribution

Year of birth missing
15th-century births
1503 deaths
Academics from Norwich
15th-century English Roman Catholic priests
15th-century English writers
16th-century English writers
16th-century male writers
16th-century English Roman Catholic priests
Carmelites
English religious writers
Burials in Norfolk
Clergy from Norwich